Narbethong may refer to:
 Narbethong, Queensland, a locality in the Barcaldine Region, Queensland, Australia
 Narbethong, Victoria, a town in central Victoria, Australia